The 2017 Tennessee Volunteers baseball team represented the University of Tennessee in the 2017 NCAA Division I baseball season.  The Volunteers played their home games at Lindsey Nelson Stadium. The team was coached by Dave Serrano in his sixth season as head coach at Tennessee. Three games prior to the end of the season, Serrano announced that he will resign at its conclusion.

Roster

Schedule and results

Record vs. conference opponents

References

Tennessee Volunteers
Tennessee Volunteers baseball seasons
Volunteers baseball